The Man Who Knew Too Much may refer to:

Films and television
 The Man Who Knew Too Much (1934 film), a film by Alfred Hitchcock starring Leslie Banks and Edna Best
 The Man Who Knew Too Much (1956 film), a film by Alfred Hitchcock starring James Stewart and Doris Day
 "The Man Who Knew Too Much" (2point4 children), a 1996 episode of British TV series 2point4 Children, season six, #5
 "The Man Who Knew Too Much", a 2011 episode of American TV series Supernatural, season six, #22

Books and magazines
 The Man Who Knew Too Much (book), a 1922 collection of detective stories by G. K. Chesterton
 The Man Who Knew Too Much, a 1994 children's book by Julius Lester
 "The Man Who Knew Too Much" (article), a 1996 Vanity Fair article by Marie Brenner about Jeffrey Wigand
 The Man Who Knew Too Much: Alan Turing and the Invention of the Computer, a 2005 book by David Leavitt

See also
 "The Man That Knew Too Much", a 2007 song by Silverchair from Young Modern 
 The Man Who Knew Too Little, a 1997 film
 "The Man Who Grew Too Much", a 2014 episode of The Simpsons
 "The Bird Who Knew Too Much", a 1967 episode of The Avengers
 The Boy Who Knew Too Much (disambiguation)
 The Girl Who Knew Too Much (disambiguation)